MuleSoft, LLC. is a software company headquartered in San Francisco, California, that provides integration software for connecting applications, data and devices. Started in 2006, the company's Anypoint Platform of integration products is designed to integrate software as a service (SaaS), on-premises software, legacy systems and other platforms.

On May 2, 2018, Salesforce acquired Mulesoft for $6.5 billion in a cash and stock deal.

History 
Ross Mason and Dave Rosenberg founded MuleSource in 2006. The "mule" in the name comes from the drudgery, or "donkey work," of data integration that the platform was created to escape.
The company changed the name to MuleSoft in 2009. 

The company originally provided middleware and messaging, and later expanded to provide an integration platform as a service (iPaaS) approach for companies through its main product, Anypoint Platform. 

In April 2013, the startup announced $37 million in Series E financing in a round led by New Enterprise Associates, with participation from new strategic investor Salesforce.com, and existing investors Hummer Winblad Venture Partners, Morgenthaler Ventures, Lightspeed Venture Partners, Meritech Capital Partners, Sapphire Ventures (formerly SAP Ventures) and Bay Partners. The round brought MuleSoft's total financing, over the course of seven funding rounds, to $259 million.

In April 2013, MuleSoft acquired ProgrammableWeb, a website used by developers to help build web, mobile and other connected applications through APIs.

In 2016, MuleSoft was ranked #20 on the Forbes Cloud 100 list.

In February 2017, the company filed for an IPO and began trading on the New York Stock Exchange on March 17, 2017.

In March 2018, Salesforce.com announced it was buying MuleSoft in a deal reported to be worth US$6.5B. In May 2018, Salesforce completed acquisition of MuleSoft.

Products
MuleSoft's Anypoint Platform includes various components such as Anypoint Design Center, which allows API developers to design and build APIs; Anypoint Exchange, a library for API providers to share APIs, templates, and assets; and Anypoint Management Center, a centralized web interface to analyze, manage, and monitor APIs and integrations. MuleSoft also offers the Mule runtime engine, a runtime solution for connecting enterprise applications on-premises and to the cloud, designed to eliminate the need for custom point-to-point integration code.

Operations
As of August 2019, MuleSoft has over 1,400 employees and 1,600 customers.

References

External links
 MuleSoft Corporate Site 

 MuleSoft Site 

Salesforce
Development software companies
Extract, transform, load tools
2006 establishments in California
Software companies established in 2006
American companies established in 2006
Enterprise application integration
Software companies based in the San Francisco Bay Area
Cloud applications
Cloud computing providers
Companies based in San Francisco
2017 initial public offerings
Companies formerly listed on the New York Stock Exchange
2018 mergers and acquisitions
Defunct software companies of the United States